The following is a list of marine ecoregions, as defined by the WWF and The Nature Conservancy

The WWF/Nature Conservancy scheme groups the individual ecoregions into 12 marine realms, which represent the broad latitudinal divisions of polar, temperate, and tropical seas, with subdivisions based on ocean basins. The marine realms are subdivided into 62 marine provinces, which include one or more of the 232 marine ecoregions.

The WWF/Nature Conservancy scheme currently encompasses only coastal and continental shelf areas.

Arctic realm
(no provinces identified)
North Greenland
North and East Iceland
East Greenland Shelf
West Greenland Shelf
Northern Grand Banks-Southern Labrador
Northern Labrador
Baffin Bay-Davis Strait
Hudson Complex
Lancaster Sound
High Arctic Archipelago
Beaufort-Admunsen-Viscount Melville-Queen Maud
Beaufort Sea-continental coast and shelf
Chukchi Sea
Eastern Bering Sea
East Siberian Sea
Laptev Sea
Kara Sea
North and East Barents Sea
White Sea

Temperate Northern Atlantic

Northern European Seas
South and West Iceland
Faroe Plateau
Southern Norway
Northern Norway and Finnmark
Baltic Sea
North Sea
Celtic Seas

Lusitanian
South European Atlantic Shelf
Saharan Upwelling
Azores Canaries Madeira

Mediterranean Sea
Adriatic Sea
Aegean Sea
Levantine Sea
Tunisian Plateau/Gulf of Sidra
Ionian Sea
Western Mediterranean
Alboran Sea

Black Sea
Black Sea

Cold Temperate Northwest Atlantic
Gulf of St. Lawrence-Eastern Scotian Shelf
Southern Grand Banks-South Newfoundland
Scotian Shelf
Gulf of Maine-Bay of Fundy
Virginian

Warm Temperate Northwest Atlantic
 Carolinian
 Northern Gulf of Mexico

Temperate Northern Pacific

Cold Temperate Northwest Pacific
Sea of Okhotsk
Kamchatka Shelf and Coast
Oyashio Current
Northern Honshu
Sea of Japan
Yellow Sea

Warm Temperate Northwest Pacific
Central Kuroshio Current
East China Sea

Cold Temperate Northeast Pacific
Aleutian Islands
Gulf of Alaska
North American Pacific Fjordland
Puget Trough/Georgia Basin
Oregon, Washington, Vancouver Coast and Shelf
Northern California

Warm Temperate Northeast Pacific
 Southern California Bight
 Cortezian
 Magdalena Transition

Tropical Atlantic

Tropical Northwestern Atlantic
 Bermuda
 Bahamian
 Eastern Caribbean
 Greater Antilles
 Southern Caribbean
 Southwestern Caribbean
 Western Caribbean
 Southern Gulf of Mexico
 Floridian

North Brazil Shelf
 Guianian
 Amazonia

Tropical Southwestern Atlantic
 Sao Pedro and Sao Paulo Islands
 Fernando de Noronha and Atol das Rocas
 Northeastern Brazil
 Eastern Brazil
 Trindade and Martin Vaz Islands

St. Helena and Ascension Islands
 St. Helena and Ascension Islands

West African Transition
 Cape Verde
 Sahelian Upwelling

Gulf of Guinea
 Gulf of Guinea West
 Gulf of Guinea Upwelling
 Gulf of Guinea Central
 Gulf of Guinea Islands
 Gulf of Guinea South
 Angolan

Western Indo-Pacific

Red Sea and Gulf of Aden
 Northern and Central Red Sea
 Southern Red Sea
 Gulf of Aden

Somali/Arabian
Persian Gulf
Gulf of Oman
Western Arabian Sea
Central Somali Coast

Western Indian Ocean 
 Northern Monsoon Current Coast
 East African Coral Coast
 Seychelles
 Cargados Carajos
 Tromelin Island
 Mascarene Islands
 Southeast Madagascar
 Western and Northern Madagascar
 Bight of Sofala/Swamp Coast
 Delagoa

West and South Indian Shelf 
 Western India
 South India and Sri Lanka

Central Indian Ocean Islands 
 Maldives
 Chagos

Bay of Bengal 
 Eastern India
 Northern Bay of Bengal

Andaman Sea
 Andaman and Nicobar Islands
 Andaman Sea Coral Coast
 Western Sumatra

Central Indo-Pacific

South China Sea
 Gulf of Tonkin
 Southern China
 South China Sea Oceanic Islands

Sunda Shelf
 Gulf of Thailand
 Southern Vietnam
 Sunda Shelf/Java Sea
 Malacca Strait

Java Transitional
Southern Java
Cocos-Keeling/Christmas Island

South Kuroshio
 South Kuroshio

Tropical Northwestern Pacific
 Ogasawara Islands
 Mariana Islands
 East Caroline Islands
 West Caroline Islands

Western Coral Triangle
 Palawan/North Borneo
 Eastern Philippines
 Sulawesi Sea/Makassar Strait
 Halmahera
 Papua
 Banda Sea
 Lesser Sunda
 Northeast Sulawesi

Eastern Coral Triangle
 Bismarck Sea
 Solomon Archipelago
 Solomon Sea
 Southeast Papua New Guinea

Sahul Shelf
 Gulf of Papua
 Arafura Sea
 Arnhem Coast to Gulf of Carpentaria
 Bonaparte Coast

Northeast Australian Shelf
 Torres Strait and Northern Great Barrier Reef
 Central and Southern Great Barrier Reef

Northwest Australian Shelf
 Exmouth to Broome
 Ningaloo

Tropical Southwestern Pacific
 Tonga Islands
 Fiji Islands
 Vanuatu
 New Caledonia
 Coral Sea

Lord Howe and Norfolk Islands
 Lord Howe and Norfolk Islands

Eastern Indo-Pacific

Hawaii
 Hawaii

Marshall, Gilbert, and Ellice Islands
 Marshall Islands
 Gilbert and Ellice Islands

Central Polynesia
 Line Islands
 Phoenix Islands/Tokelau/Northern Cook Islands
 Samoa Islands

Southeast Polynesia
 Tuamotus
 Rapa-Pitcairn
 Southern Cook/Austral Islands
 Society Islands

Marquesas
 Marquesas

Easter Island
 Easter Island

Tropical Eastern Pacific

Tropical East Pacific
 Revillagigedos
 Clipperton
 Mexican Tropical Pacific
 Chiapas-Nicaragua
 Nicoya
 Cocos Islands
 Panama Bight
 Guayaquil

Galapagos
 Northern Galapagos Islands
 Eastern Galapagos Islands
 Western Galapagos Islands

Temperate South America

Warm Temperate Southeastern Pacific
 Central Peru
 Humboldtian
 Central Chile
 Araucanian

Juan Fernandez and Desventuradas
 Juan Fernandez and Desventuradas

Warm Temperate Southwestern Atlantic
 Southeastern Brazil
 Rio Grande
 Rio de la Plata
 Uruguay-Buenos Aires Shelf

Magellanic
 North Patagonian Gulfs
 Patagonian Shelf
 Falkland Islands
 Channels and Fjords of Southern Chile
 Chiloense

Tristan-Gough
 Tristan-Gough

Temperate Southern Africa

Benguela
 Namib
 Namaqua

Agulhas
 Agulhas Bank
 Natal

Amsterdam-St Paul
 Amsterdam-Saint-Paul

Temperate Australasia

Northern New Zealand
 Kermadec Islands (195)
 Northeastern New Zealand (196)
 Three Kings-North Cape (197)

Southern New Zealand
 Chatham Island (198)
 Central New Zealand (199)
 South New Zealand (200)
 Snares Island (201)

East Central Australian Shelf
Tweed-Moreton (202)
Manning-Hawkesbury (203)

Southeast Australian Shelf
 Cape Howe (204)
 Bassian (205)
 Western Bassian (206)

Southwest Australian Shelf
 South Australian Gulfs (207)
 Great Australian Bight (208)
 Leeuwin (209)

Western Central Australian Shelf
 Shark Bay (210)
 Houtman (211)

Southern Ocean

Subantarctic Islands
 Macquarie Island
 Heard Island and McDonald Islands
 Kerguelen Islands
 Crozet Islands
 Prince Edward Islands
 Bouvet Island
 Peter the First Island

Scotia Sea
 South Sandwich Islands
 South Georgia
 South Orkney Islands
 South Shetland Islands
 Antarctic Peninsula

Continental High Antarctic
 East Antarctic Wilkes Land
 East Antarctic Enderby Land
 East Antarctic Dronning Maud Land
 Weddell Sea
 Amundsen/Bellingshausen Sea
 Ross Sea

Subantarctic New Zealand
 Bounty and Antipodes Islands
 Campbell Island
 Auckland Island

See also

 List of terrestrial ecoregions (WWF)

Notes

References
 Spalding, Mark D., Helen E. Fox, Gerald R. Allen, Nick Davidson et al. "Marine Ecoregions of the World: A Bioregionalization of Coastal and Shelf Areas". Bioscience Vol. 57 No. 7, July/August 2007, pp. 573–583.

External links

 World Wildlife Fund—WWF:  Marine Ecoregions of the World (MEOW)
 Queries listing ecoregions  and provinces  from Wikidata

.List
.marine
marine
Aquatic ecology
Biological oceanography
ecoregions
marine